Jaleshwar Mahato is a politician from Jharkhand, India. He represented the Baghmara (Vidhan Sabha constituency) during the year 2000 to 2009. He represented the constituency as a Janata Dal (United) MLA. He is Jharkhand State President of Janata Dal (United).

Jaleshwar Mahato joined the Congress on 29 December 2018 in presence of Rahul Gandhi at New Delhi.

References

Members of the Jharkhand Legislative Assembly
Living people
Year of birth missing (living people)
Janata Dal (United) politicians from Jharkhand